Shark Peak is an isolated nunatak 3.5 miles (6 km) south-southwest of Van Hulssen Nunatak in the Framnes Mountains of Mac. Robertson Land. It was mapped by Norwegian cartographers from air photos taken by the Lars Christensen Expedition in 1936–37, and named Hanuten (the shark peak). The translated form of the name recommended by Antarctic Names Committee of Australia (ANCA) has been adopted.

Nunataks of Mac. Robertson Land